The Lugano District ( also called Luganese) is a district of Canton of Ticino, southern Switzerland. The capital is the city of Lugano.

Geography
Of this area,  or 15.7% is used for agricultural purposes, while  or 66.5% is forested.

Of the built-up area, housing and buildings made up 9.1% and transportation infrastructure made up 3.6%.  Out of the forested land, 59.6% of the total land area is heavily forested and 3.7% is covered with orchards or small clusters of trees.  Of the agricultural land, 5.7% is used for growing crops and 9.1% is used for alpine pastures.  Of the water in the district, 0.2% is in lakes and 0.5% is in rivers and streams.  Of the unproductive areas, 4.2% is unproductive vegetation.

Demographics
Of the Swiss national languages, 104,413 people speak Italian, 11,397 speak German, 2,683 people speak French, and 184 people speak Romansh. The remainder (9,904 people) speak another language.

, the gender distribution of the population was 47.8% male and 52.2% female.  The population was made up of 46,739 Swiss men (32.8% of the population), and 21,361 (15.0%) non-Swiss men.  There were 55,315 Swiss women (38.8%), and 19,062 (13.4%) non-Swiss women.

In  there were 964 live births to Swiss citizens and 364 births to non-Swiss citizens, and in the same time span, there were 884 deaths of Swiss citizens and 195 non-Swiss citizens deaths.  Ignoring immigration and emigration, the population of Swiss citizens increased by 80 while the foreign population increased by 169.  There were 3 Swiss men and 5 Swiss women who immigrated back to Switzerland.  At the same time, there were 1224 non-Swiss men and 1025 non-Swiss women who immigrated from another country to Switzerland.  The total Swiss population change in 2008 (from all sources) was an increase of 954 and the non-Swiss population change was an increase of 1387 people.  This represents a population growth rate of 1.7%.

The age distribution, in the Lugano District is: 13,106 children or 9.2% of the population are between 0 and 9 years old and 14,319 teenagers or 10.1% are between 10 and 19.  Of the adult population, 15,026 people or 10.5% of the population are between 20 and 29 years old.  20,647 people or 14.5% are between 30 and 39, 24,237 people or 17.0% are between 40 and 49, and 18,617 people or 13.1% are between 50 and 59.  The senior population distribution is 16,900 people or 11.9% of the population are between 60 and 69 years old, 11,858 people or 8.3% are between 70 and 79, there are 7,767 people or 5.5% who are over 80.

 there were 39,438 single family homes (or 38.1% of the total) out of a total of 103,629 inhabited buildings.  There were 12,956 two family buildings (12.5%) and 39,313 multi-family buildings (37.9%).  There were also 11,922 buildings in the district that were multipurpose buildings (used for both housing and commercial or another purpose).

 there were 72,885 apartments in the district.  The most common apartment size was the 3 room apartment of which there were 20,908.  There were 5,376 single room apartments and 14,950 apartments with five or more rooms.  Of these apartments, a total of 57,003 apartments (78.2% of the total) were permanently occupied, while 13,691 apartments (18.8%) were seasonally occupied and 2,191 apartments (3.0%) were empty.

The historical population is given in the following table:

Politics
In the 2007 federal election the most popular party was the FDP which received 26.24% of the vote.  The next three most popular parties were the CVP (22.21%), the SP (17.58%) and the Ticino League (16.3%).  In the federal election, a total of 38,965 votes were cast, and the voter turnout was 46.5%.

In the  Ticino Gran Consiglio election, there were a total of 83,196 registered voters in the Lugano District, of which 49,848 or 59.9% voted.  722 blank ballots and 125 null ballots were cast, leaving 49,001 valid ballots in the election.  The most popular party was the PLRT which received 11,883 or 24.3% of the vote.  The next three most popular parties were; the PPD+GenGiova (with 8,382 or 17.1%), the LEGA (with 8,086 or 16.5%) and the SSI (with 8,006 or 16.3%).

In the  Ticino Consiglio di Stato election, 487 blank ballots and 198 null ballots were cast, leaving 49,168 valid ballots in the election.  The most popular party was the LEGA which received 11,371 or 23.1% of the vote.  The next three most popular parties were; the PLRT (with 11,352 or 23.1%), the PS (with 8,585 or 17.5%) and the PPD (with 8,205 or 16.7%).

Religion
There are 17,787 individuals (or about 13.83% of the population) who belong to another church (not listed on the census), and 6,464 individuals (or about 5.03% of the population) did not answer the question.

Education
In the Lugano District there was a total of 22,026 students.  The Ticino education system provides up to three years of non-mandatory kindergarten and in the Lugano District, there were 3,629 children in kindergarten.  The primary school program lasts for five years and includes both a standard school and a special school.  In the district, 6,643 students attended the standard primary schools and 246 students attended the special school.  In the lower secondary school system, students either attend a two-year middle school followed by a two-year pre-apprenticeship or they attend a four-year program to prepare for higher education.  There were 5,421 students in the two-year middle school and 80 in their pre-apprenticeship, while 2,441 students were in the four-year advanced program.

The upper secondary school includes several options, but at the end of the upper secondary program, a student will be prepared to enter a trade or to continue on to a university or college.  In Ticino, vocational students may either attend school while working on their internship or apprenticeship (which takes three or four years) or may attend school followed by an internship or apprenticeship (which takes one year as a full-time student or one and a half to two years as a part-time student).  There were 1,334 vocational students who were attending school full-time and 1,984 who attend part-time.

The professional program lasts three years and prepares a student for a job in engineering, nursing, computer science, business, tourism and similar fields.  There were 248 students in the professional program.

Circles and municipalities 

The district of Lugano has 59 municipalities divided in 12 circles:

Merger and name changes
On 14 April 2013 the former municipalities of Bogno, Cadro, Carona, Certara, Cimadera, Sonvico, and Valcolla merged into the municipality of Lugano.
On 18 April 2021, the former municipalities of Croglio, Monteggio, Ponte Tresa, and Sessa merged to form the new municipality of Tresa.
On 10 April 2022, the former municipalities of Maroggia, Melano and Rovio merged to form the new municipality of Val Mara.

References

External links
 Official list of municipalities, circles and districts of Ticino

Districts of Ticino
Lugano